Levi Yates was a football player who made ten appearances in the English Football League playing for Nottingham Forest.

Levi Yates started his career at Gresley Rovers. He was transferred to Forest for £100 during the 1913–14 season and made his Nottingham Forest debut on 18 October 1913 against Blackpool in a 3–0 victory. He scored his only goal for Forest against Notts County on Christmas Day 1913. His last game was the final game of the season on 25 April 1914 away at Stockport County.

Levi Yates returned to Gresley Rovers for the 1914–15 season.

References 

Gresley F.C. players
Nottingham Forest F.C. players
Year of birth missing
Year of death missing
English footballers
Association football forwards